RLX may refer to:

 Acura RLX, an automobile produced by Honda for the US market
 RLX Technologies, a computer hardware company
 RLX Technology, a Chinese e-cigarette company founded by Kate Wang